Urodacus macrurus is a species of scorpion in the Urodacidae family. It is endemic to Australia, and was first described in 1899 by British zoologist Reginald Innes Pocock.

Distribution and habitat
The species occurs in Queensland.

References

 

 
macrurus
Scorpions of Australia
Endemic fauna of Australia
Fauna of Queensland
Animals described in 1899
Taxa named by R. I. Pocock